Matic Šušteršič (27 February 1980 – 5 June 2005) was a Slovenian sprinter. He competed in the men's 4 × 100 metres relay at the 2000 Summer Olympics.

References

1980 births
2005 deaths
Athletes (track and field) at the 2000 Summer Olympics
Slovenian male sprinters
Olympic athletes of Slovenia
Place of birth missing